The 2006 West Edmonton Mall Grand Prix of Edmonton was the eighth round of the 2006 Bridgestone Presents the Champ Car World Series Powered by Ford season, held on July 23, 2006, at JAGFlo Speedway, a temporary track laid out at City Centre Airport in Edmonton, Alberta, Canada.  Sébastien Bourdais took the pole but the race was won by Justin Wilson.

Qualifying results

Race

Caution flags

Notes

 New Track Record Sébastien Bourdais 58.560 (Qualification Session #2)
 New Race Lap Record Justin Wilson 59.200
 New Race Record Justin Wilson 1:40:30.635
 Average Speed 100.112 mph

Championship standings after the race

Drivers' Championship standings

 Note: Only the top five positions are included.

External links
 Friday Qualifying Results
 Saturday Qualifying Results 
 Race Results
 Weather Information

2006 in Champ Car
2
2006 in Canadian motorsport
2006 in Alberta